Brandon Alan Boudreaux (born June 26, 1989) is a professional Canadian football defensive end who is currently a free agent. He was signed by the Hamilton Tiger-Cats as a free agent in 2012. He played high school football for the Auburn High School Tigers and college football for the Troy Trojans.

High school career
Boudreaux went to Auburn High School. At Auburn High, Boudreaux was a three-year letter-winner under coaches Robert Maddox and Tim Carter.

College career
Boudreaux played for four seasons at Troy.  In 2011, Boudreaux was rated as one of the 10 strongest players in college football.

Professional career

Boudreaux signed with the Hamilton Tiger-Cats as a free agent on May 29, 2012. In his first five games with the Tiger-Cats, he recorded seven tackles and three sacks. He was traded to the Saskatchewan Roughriders on September 24, 2014.

Upon entering free agency, Boudreaux signed with the Calgary Stampeders on February 11, 2015.

References

External links
Calgary Stampeders bio 
Saskatchewan Roughriders bio
Hamilton Tiger-Cats bio

Players of American football from Alabama
Auburn High School (Alabama) alumni
Sportspeople from Auburn, Alabama
American players of Canadian football
Canadian football defensive linemen
American football defensive linemen
Troy Trojans football players
Hamilton Tiger-Cats players
Saskatchewan Roughriders players
Calgary Stampeders players
1989 births
Living people